Dantine is a surname. Notable people with the surname include:

Helmut Dantine (1917–1982), Austrian-American actor
Maurus Dantine (1688–1746), Belgian Benedictine and chronologist

See also
Michel Dantin (born 1960), French politician